The Keflavík men's basketball team, commonly known as Keflavík, is the men's professional basketball department of Keflavík ÍF (Keflavík, íþrótta- og ungmennafélag), based in the town of Reykjanesbær in Iceland. They currently play in Úrvalsdeild karla.

Rivalry with Njarðvík 
Keflavík's biggest rivals are their closest neighbours, Njarðvík. The teams are both based in Reykjanesbær. Keflavík and Njarðvík were neighbouring towns but were merged in 1994 and formed Reykjanesbær. Their arenas are within one kilometre of each other. In the 2008–09 season the rivalry was intensified as the men's teams were coached by brothers, Sigurður Ingimundarson with Keflavík and Valur Ingimundarson with Njarðvík. At the end of that season Sigurður left his post as the team's coach and moved to a club in Sweden. He was replaced by former player Guðjón Skúlason. Just before the start of the 2009–10 season Sigurður became coach of Njarðvík, replacing his brother Valur.

Arena
The club's home arena is nicknamed "The Slaughterhouse".

Achievements

Titles 
Icelandic champions: (9):
1989, 1992, 1993, 1997, 1999, 2003, 2004, 2005, 2008
Icelandic Basketball Cup: (5):
1993, 1994, 1997, 2003, 2004
Super Cup: (3):
1997, 2003, 2008
Company Cup: (6):
1996, 1997, 1998, 2002, 2006, 2013
1. deild karla: (2):
1982, 1985
2. deild karla: (1):
1978

Notable players

Head coaches

Trivia
 The team has a reputation for playing an uptempo game which earned it the nickname Keflavíkurhraðlestin (The Keflavík Express).

References

External links
 Official website
Team profile at Eurobasket

Keflavík (basketball)